The Free routine combination competition at the 2019 World Aquatics Championships was held on 18 and 20 July 2019.

Results
The preliminary round was started on 18 July at 11:00. The final was started on 20 July at 19:00.

Green denotes finalists

References

Free routine combination